Liepāja Station is the railway station  for Liepāja on the Jelgava – Liepāja Railway.

History
The station was built in 1871 as the first station in the Libau–Romny Railway, Libau being the German name of the city in use at the time.

References 

Liepāja
Railway stations in Latvia
Railway stations opened in 1871